Clearview Local School District was formed on  and serves students from Sheffield Township, Ohio and part of Lorain, Ohio. Clearview has three school buildings.  Vincent Elementary houses K-4 and was built in the 1912, Durling Middle School houses 5-8 and was built in 1952 and Clearview High School houses 9-12 and was built in 1923.  In 2004 all three buildings were greatly renovated and expanded, thanks to the Ohio School Facilities Commission 23 million dollars.  At Vincent and Clearview all the older sections were demolished and made way for new classrooms.

References

External links

School districts in Ohio
Education in Lorain County, Ohio
Lorain, Ohio
School districts established in 1928